Anti-incumbency is sentiment in favor of voting out incumbent politicians. It is sometimes referred to as a "throw the bums out" sentiment. Periods of anti-incumbent sentiment are typically characterized by wave elections. This sentiment can also lead to support for term limits.

In a two-party system, anti-incumbent voters have only one party to vote for, when voting against the incumbent; in a multi-party system, public mood, i.e., the tendency of opinions held by voters over a set of related policy issues, can determine which parties receive the anti-incumbent vote.

Causes
When voters perceive times as bad, this can cause anti-incumbent sentiment. However, this is subject to biases. Perceptions of whether, e.g., economic conditions have worsened during a politician's term are influenced by partisan bias, for instance. In the U.S., reliance on partisan media, as opposed to mainstream media, is associated with anti-incumbent attitudes toward Congress. New democracies' elections, such as those in Central and Eastern Europe, and in Latin America and Asia, often are characterized by anti-incumbency.

History

Bulgaria
In Bulgaria, virtually every government has been ousted from power after one legislative period.

Bhutan
The 2018 Bhutan elections had an anti-incumbent result.

India
India has the highest rate of anti-incumbency in the world, with incumbents from the ruling party having only a fifty-fifty shot at returning to parliament. For example, since 1985, the electorate in Assam, India has oscillated between voting the Asom Gana Parishad and the Indian National Congress to power. In Karnataka, the last time the ruling government was re-elected was in the 1985 Indian elections. Kerala has always voted in whichever is the opposition pre-poll alliance since 1982 assembly elections. Voter turnout does not appear correlated with incumbents' electoral performance.

In 2018, India's period of anti-incumbency was accompanied by acute rural distress, multiple farmer agitations and serious joblessness.

Mexico
In the 2010 Mexican gubernatorial elections, incumbents from the Institutional Revolutionary Party, National Action Party, and Party of the Democratic Revolution were rejected.

United States
Eras of anti-incumbent sentiment included the Gilded Age, in which the majority party in the U.S. House of Representatives shifted six times in the 15 Congressional elections between 1870 and 1900, with three of those shifts involving losses of more than 70 seats by the majority party. David M. Kennedy notes, "Generations of American scholars have struggled to find a coherent narrative or to identify heroic leaders in that era's messy and inconclusive political scene."

The 1992 United States elections were also characterized by anti-incumbent sentiment, as a stubborn recession and persistently high unemployment fuelled voter dissatisfaction. A 2013 poll found that 60% of Americans would vote to "defeat and replace every single member of Congress, including [their] own representative" if that option were available.

The concept of anti-incumbency, at least with regard to U.S. elections, is controversial, since more often voters will punish only one party. Three organizations that supported voting out incumbents were Throw the Hypocritical Rascals Out, Vote Out Incumbents Democracy and Tenure Corrupts.

Criticism
A perceived disadvantage of anti-incumbency, with regard to judicial elections, is that good lawyers will not want to accept what they regard as a revolving-door judgeship. Another criticism of anti-incumbency is that it causes political parties to focus on single-term policies rather than long-term development.

References

Politics